Masato Kobayashi (小林 正人, born August 21, 1980) is a Japanese former professional baseball pitcher. Kobayashi played for the Chunichi Dragons in Japan's Nippon Professional Baseball from 2005 to 2014.

External links

NPB.com

1980 births
Living people
Baseball people from Gunma Prefecture
Tokai University alumni
Japanese expatriate baseball players in the Dominican Republic
Nippon Professional Baseball pitchers
Chunichi Dragons players
Leones del Escogido players